"Gotta Getcha" is a song by American record producer Jermaine Dupri, released as the first single from his compilation album Young, Fly & Flashy, Vol. 1 (2005). The album version features vocals by Johntá Austin, and uncredited vocals from Janet Jackson and Missy Elliott, who helped write the song alongside Dupri. The original version featured Elliott rapping and singing the chorus. The official remix features Usher, Johntá Austin and Rico Love. Another remix featuring Usher, Johntá Austin and Missy Elliott was released via mixtapes.

Charts

References 

Jermaine Dupri songs
Virgin Records singles
2005 singles
Song recordings produced by Jermaine Dupri
Songs written by Missy Elliott
Songs written by Johntá Austin
Music videos directed by Bryan Barber
2005 songs
Songs written by Jermaine Dupri